Javed Zadran is an Afghan cricketer. He made his first-class debut for Amo Region in the 2017–18 Ahmad Shah Abdali 4-day Tournament on 26 October 2017. He made his List A debut for Kabul Region in the 2018 Ghazi Amanullah Khan Regional One Day Tournament on 15 July 2018.

References

External links
 

Year of birth missing (living people)
Living people
Afghan cricketers
Amo Sharks cricketers
Kabul Eagles cricketers
Place of birth missing (living people)